Guneet "Bunty" Walia is an Indian film producer and sport entrepreneur. He has produced films like Lamhaa, Hello Brother, Ek Ajnabee  and Pyaar Kiya To Darna Kya starring actors like Arbaaz Khan, Dharmendra and Salman Khan.  He is the COO for the Jaipur Pink Panthers, (a professional kabaddi team), the PKL team is officially managed by Walia's sports management firm, GS Sports. He has been with the team since its inception and is an active voice in the base strategies of the Jaipur Pink Panthers.

Filmography

Personal life
Bunty Walia was married to Suman Ranganath in 2006 but they split in May 2007.  later Walia is married to Vanessa Parmar (m. 2012) and the couple share two children.  He is brother of Juspreet Singh Walia.

G.S. Worldwide Entertainment 
Bunty is the chairman of GS Worldwide Entertainment. It is an entertainment company that produces movies. Some of the biggest Bollywood actors have worked alongside them to produce big named movies in India.

Charities 
Bunty has contributed to the Maigic Bus charity created by the NGO for raising funds for underprivileged children. He as also aimed to raise funds for varied charities and one of the causes they are supporting is that of self-defense for women. Another portion of the will be to fund the state-of-the-art-gym at Andheri Sports Complex. He has organized charity football match with actors and athletes to raise more funds for the Magic Bus charity.

External links

References 

Living people
Film producers from Mumbai
Year of birth missing (living people)
Hindi film producers
Indian film producers
Punjabi people
Ahluwalia